Ellijay is a city in Gilmer County, Georgia, United States. The population was 1,619 at the 2010 census. The city is the county seat of Gilmer County.

Agriculture is important in Gilmer County, known as the "Apple Capital of Georgia." The city holds an annual Georgia Apple Festival in October.

Former President Jimmy Carter and his wife Rosalynn own a pine cabin second home in Ellijay. Other tourists are attracted to the mountains and whitewater kayaking.

History
This area was long settled by cultures of indigenous peoples. It was known as part of the homeland of the historic Cherokee people. They had a village here, at the confluence of the Ellijay and Cartecay rivers, which together form the Coosawattee River.

Ellijay (sometimes formerly spelled "Elejoy") is the anglicized form or transliteration of the Cherokee name Elatseyi, meaning "new ground". Other sources say it means "green place".

Gilmer County was organized by territory cut from Cherokee County in 1832, and Ellijay was designated as its county seat in 1834. It was a fairly isolated and remote mountain community until the late nineteenth century. After the Marietta and Northern Georgia Railroad (later the Louisville and Nashville Railroad) was constructed through here in 1884, the railroad stimulated a boom in the timber industry by providing a profitable way to get lumber to markets. Many timber companies came into the area with their workers.

More than a century later, another major transportation improvement was construction of the Zell Miller Mountain Parkway (Georgia 515, named for Georgia governor and U.S. senator Zell Miller), which was completed in 1991.

Geography 
It is situated at the confluence of the Ellijay and Cartecay rivers, which together form the Coosawattee River. The Coosawattee flows west as part of the Oostanaula/Coosa/Alabama River watershed. The county seat is bordered to the east and south by the city of East Ellijay.

Climate 
Ellijay lies within the Humid subtropical climate zone along with the majority of the rest of the southeastern United States.  The highest elevations in the surrounding region reside in the Subtropical highland climate.  Ellijay enjoys cool winters and warm summers, but neither would be considered extreme thanks to its slightly higher elevation than other areas in the south.  Winter snowfall is common, but generally on the lighter side.  There are a few exceptions, one being the 1993 Storm of the Century which dropped 17 inches of snow in Ellijay.  Summers are warm, though mild for southern standards, with temperatures topping out in the mid 80s during the summer months.  Rain is evenly distributed throughout the year averaging 57.97 inches per year, as reported from the nearest NOAA reporting station in Jasper, Georgia.

Demographics

2020 census

As of the 2020 United States Census, there were 1,862 people, 844 households, and 520 families residing in the city.

2000 census
As of the census of 2000, there were 1,584 people, 593 households, and 342 families residing in the city. The racial makeup of the city was 81.25% White, 1.39% African American, 0.00% Native American, 1.70% Asian, 0.57% Pacific Islander, 12.50% from other races, and 2.46% from two or more races. Hispanic or Latino of any race were 25.19% of the population.

There were 593 households, out of which 26.8% had children under the age of 18 living with them, 36.1% were married couples living together, 16.5% had a female householder with no husband present, and 42.2% were non-families. 37.6% of all households were made up of individuals, and 20.4% had someone living alone who was 65 years of age or older.  The average household size was 2.49 and the average family size was 3.14.

In the city, the population was spread out, with 22.9% under the age of 18, 10.5% from 18 to 24, 25.0% from 25 to 44, 19.7% from 45 to 64, and 21.9% who were 65 years of age or older.  The median age was 38 years. For every 100 females, there were 93.2 males.  For every 100 females age 18 and over, there were 88.9 males.

The median income for a household in the city was $22,120, and the median income for a family was $36,250. Males had a median income of $21,875 versus $20,469 for females. The per capita income for the city was $13,740.  About 20.3% of families and 27.5% of the population were below the poverty line, including 27.3% of those under age 18 and 31.7% of those age 65 or over.

Government
Ellijay is governed by a five-member city council and a mayor. The current mayor is William Albert "Al" Hoyle.

Education

Gilmer County School District 
The Gilmer County School District holds pre-school to grade twelve, and consists of three elementary schools, one middle school, and one high school. There is also Crossroads, which is the alternative school in Ellijay.
Ellijay Elementary School
Mountain View Elementary School
Clear Creek Elementary School
Oakland Elementary School (closed in 2011, due to county budget constraints)
Clear Creek Middle School
Gilmer High School

Private Schools 
North Georgia Christian Academy
Pleasant Hills Montessori School 
Grace Christian School
Josephine Edwards Christian School
Mountain Academy
First Baptist Church Pre-School
Children's First Pre-School

Higher Education

Higher education
Dalton State College Appalachian Campus - Gilmer County Center This is a satellite campus of Dalton State

Notable people

 Johnny Quarles (1946–2008), western author wrote over a dozen novels and television screenplays, including iconic titles like Brack and Fool's Gold, and television screenplays for programs such as Lonesome Dove, many of them featuring Ellijay settings
 Jay Allen Sanford (1960-present), author and cartoonist best known as the co-creator of Rock 'N' Roll Comics, and for his work with Revolutionary Comics, Carnal Comics, and the San Diego Reader
 C. Thomas Howell (1966-present), actor known for films such as Soul Man, The Hitcher, Grandview U.S.A., Red Dawn, Secret Admirer and The Outsiders.
 Col. Oscar Poole (1930-2020), longtime Methodist minister and radio personality whose Uncle Sam suit became a fixture at Republican events, where he promoted his Ellijay BBQ restaurant

References

Cities in Georgia (U.S. state)
Cities in Gilmer County, Georgia
County seats in Georgia (U.S. state)